"Lay You Down Easy" is a song recorded by Canadian reggae fusion band Magic! featuring Sean Paul for their second studio album, Primary Colours (2016). On March 24, 2016, the song was issued to Digital download by RCA Records as the first single from the album.

Music video
The music video for "Lay You Down Easy" was uploaded to the band's official Vevo channel on March 25, 2016.

Charts

Year-end charts

Certifications

References

2016 songs
2016 singles
Sean Paul songs
Reggae fusion songs
RCA Records singles
Songs written by Mark "Pelli" Pellizzer
Songs written by Sean Paul
Songs written by Nasri (musician)
Songs written by Adam Messinger
Magic! songs